Benasque (in Benasquese dialect: Benás) is a town in the comarca of Ribagorza, province of Huesca, (Spain). It is the main town in the Benasque Valley, located in the heart of the Pyrenees and surrounded by the highest peaks in that range.

Climate 
The climate is of a high mountain type, with cool summers, and cold winters and frequent snow. Its average annual temperature is 9.4 degrees Celsius (at 1138 meters above sea level).

Language 
 
 
The regional language of Benasque is a Catalan–Aragonese transitional dialect that shares features with Gascon (Occitan). It is usually called patués ("patois") by its native speakers. Possessing features that are transitional between Aragonese and Catalan, it has sometimes been classified as a variety of Catalan.

To promote the local language, the local council has held an annual writing and poetry competition in patués since 1999. Separate awards are given to young and grown-up authors.

Gallery

References

External links
 Benasque Guide
 Benasque Guide
 Centro de Ciencias de Benasque Pedro Pascual
 Benasqués - an article about the culture and the language of Benasque in Gran Enciclopedia Aragonesa OnLine

References

Municipalities in the Province of Huesca
Pyrenees